"Girls Just Want to Have Sums" is the nineteenth episode of the seventeenth season of the American animated television series The Simpsons. It originally aired on the Fox network in the United States on April 30, 2006.

Plot
The Simpsons see a performance of Stab-a-Lot: The Itchy and Scratchy Musical. Juliana Kellner, the show's director and former student of Springfield Elementary School, greets the reception along with Principal Skinner, who acknowledges Juliana's straight A's at the school but attributes her "B or two" in math to being a girl. Skinner's attempts to defend himself make the situation worse, and he is beaten by the Itchy and Scratchy puppeteers.

The next day, the teachers of Springfield Elementary stage a protest outside the school. Skinner holds a conference to address the protest. Nothing he says or does appeases the women, so Superintendent Chalmers introduces a new principal, Melanie Upfoot, who segregates the school across gender lines. Marge tries to cheer Lisa up by pointing out the contributions of women to society. When Homer and Bart remark that men are more important than women, Marge forces Homer to sleep on the couch.

Lisa initially looks forward to the all-girls school, but discovers Upfoot's math lessons are New Age. Lisa infiltrates the boys' school, where actual math is being taught. Lisa disguises herself as a boy and attends the boys' school, where she gets nicknamed "Toilet". After Lisa inadvertently gets into a fight with Nelson, Bart vows to help her blend into the boys' school.

Lisa is accepted by the boys, and is recognized for her performance in math. She then reveals her true identity. Bart claims she only did well because she learned to think like a boy. In response, she throws her award at him, and is shocked at her violent behavior. Lisa ends her speech by saying how proud she is of her feminism and her intelligence.

Awards
Matt Selman was nominated for a Writers Guild of America Award for Outstanding Writing in Animation at the 59th Writers Guild of America Awards for his script to this episode.

References

External links

See also

Sex segregation
"Math class is tough!" --Teen Talk Barbie
Social Justice Warrior

The Simpsons (season 17) episodes
2006 American television episodes
Cross-dressing in television
Television episodes about sexism